"Still" is a 1979 song by the soul music group the Commodores. It was released as a single on Motown Records with "Such a Woman" as the B-side. The song appears on their 1979 hit album Midnight Magic. It is notable for being their last No. 1 before Lionel Richie went solo.

Cash Box said it was a "tender, lilting ballad" with "a soft, building piano figure" and "expressive, plaintive lead vocal."  Billboard praised the " poignant lyric and slow, romantic melodyline." Record World said that "The fragile piano and sensitive vocal ballad make an impact with a simple arrangement that bursts into a horn/string melodrama."

Chart history

Weekly charts

Year-end charts

All-time charts

Cover versions
In 1981, actor-singer John Schneider took a cover version to No. 69 on the pop chart. It was the B-side to his country single "Them Good Ol' Boys Are Bad", which reached No. 13 on the country chart.

The song was covered in a Cantonese version by Hong Kong singer Alan Tam as "My Heart Is Only You"（我的心只有你）.

References

External links
 List of cover versions of "Still" at SecondHandSongs.com

1979 songs
1979 singles
1981 singles
Commodores songs
Motown singles
Billboard Hot 100 number-one singles
Cashbox number-one singles
John Schneider (screen actor) songs
Songs written by Lionel Richie
Song recordings produced by James Anthony Carmichael
Soul ballads
Pop ballads
1970s ballads